The Metaphysical Society was a famous British debating society, founded in 1869 by James Knowles, who acted as Secretary. Membership was by invitation only, and was exclusively male. Many of its members were prominent clergymen, philosophers, and politicians.

Overview
The society met monthly, from November to July (to mirror the sitting of Parliament). Its members were never all present at once, and most meetings never exceeded twenty attendees. Papers were read and discussed at meetings on such subjects as the ultimate grounds of belief in the objective and moral sciences, the immortality of the soul, etc. A description of one of the meetings was given by William Connor Magee (then Bishop of Peterborough) in a letter on 13 February 1873:

Archbishop Manning in the chair was flanked by two Protestant bishops right and left; on my right was Hutton, editor of the Spectator, an Arian; then came Father Dalgairns, a very able Roman Catholic priest; opposite him Lord A. Russell, a Deist; then two Scotch metaphysical writers, Freethinkers; then Knowles, the very broad editor of the Contemporary; then, dressed as a layman and looking like a country squire, was Ward, formerly Rev. Ward, and earliest of the perverts to Rome; then Greg, author of The Creed of Christendom, a Deist; then Froude, the historian, once a deacon in our Church, now a Deist; then Roden Noël, an actual Atheist and red republican, and looking very like one! Lastly Ruskin, who read a paper on miracles, which we discussed for an hour and a half! Nothing could be calmer, fairer, or even, on the whole, more reverent than the discussion. In my opinion, we, the Christians, had much the best of it. Dalgairns, the priest, was very masterly; Manning, clever and precise and weighty; Froude, very acute, and so was Greg. We only wanted a Jew and a Muslim to make our Religious Museum complete (Life, i. 284).

The last meeting of the society was held on 16 May 1880 and it was dissolved later in November of that year. Huxley said that it died "of too much love"; Tennyson, "because after ten years of strenuous effort no one had succeeded in even defining metaphysics." According to Dean Stanley, "We all meant the same thing if we only knew it."

In 1877 Knowles founded The Nineteenth Century, a literary journal whose editorial style was partly inspired by the debates he had managed at the Metaphysical Society. Many of the society's members became supporters and contributors to the magazine.

Members 

The members from first to last were as follows:

Dean Stanley, of Westminster Abbey
John Robert Seeley, English essayist and historian.
Roden Noël, poet
James Martineau, English philosopher 
William Benjamin Carpenter,  physiologist and naturalist
James Hinton, surgeon and author
Thomas Henry Huxley, Darwinist biologist
John Tyndall, physicist
Charles Pritchard, astronomer
Richard Holt Hutton, writer and theologian.
William George Ward, Catholic theologian
Walter Bagehot, economist and editor
James Anthony Froude, historian
Alfred, Lord Tennyson, Poet Laureate
Alfred Barry
Lord Arthur Russell, British politician
William Ewart Gladstone, Liberal Prime Minister
Henry Edward Manning, Archbishop and Cardinal
James Knowles, architect and editor
John Lubbock, 1st Baron Avebury
Henry Alford, churchman, scholar, and poet
Sir Alexander Grant
Connop Thirlwall
Frederic Harrison
Father Dalgairns
Sir George Grove
Shadworth Hodgson
Henry Sidgwick
Edmund Lushington
Bishop Charles Ellicott
Mark Pattison
George Campbell, 8th Duke of Argyll
John Ruskin
Robert Lowe, 1st Viscount Sherbrooke
Sir Mountstuart Elphinstone Grant-Duff
William Rathbone Greg
Alexander Campbell Fraser
Henry Acland
John Frederick Denison Maurice
Archbishop Thomson
Thomas Mozely
Richard William Church
William Connor Magee
George Croom Robertson
James Fitzjames Stephen
James Joseph Sylvester
John Charles Bucknill
Andrew Clark
William Kingdon Clifford
St. George Jackson Mivart
Matthew Piers Watt Boulton, classicist and amateur scientist
William Waldegrave Palmer, 2nd Earl of Selborne
John Morley
Leslie Stephen
Frederick Pollock
Francis Aidan Gasquet
C Barnes Upton
William Withey Gull
Robert Clarke
Arthur Balfour
James Sully
Alfred Barratt

References 
Citations

Bibliography
 Brown, Alan Willard The Metaphysical Society: Victorian Minds in Crisis, 1869-1880. New York: Columbia U.P., 1947.
 The papers of the Metaphysical Society, 1869-1880 : a critical edition, Oxford ; New York : Oxford University Press, 2015, 3 volumes.
 Catherine Marshall; Bernard V Lightman; Richard England, The Metaphysical Society (1869-1880) : intellectual life in mid-Victorian England, Oxford ; New York, NY : Oxford University Press, 2019.

Further reading 
 Hajdenko-Marshall, Catherine.  Believing After Darwin: The Debates of the Metaphysical Society (1869–1880), Cahiers victoriens et édouardien online, Vol. 76, Autumn, 2012, published online 20 April 2013, p. 69–83.
 Hutton, R. H. "The Metaphysical Society: a reminiscence", The Nineteenth Century magazine, 18 August 1885, pp. 177–196.
 Metcalf, P. "James Knowles: Victorian editor and architect", 1980.

Metaphysics
19th-century philosophy
Philosophical societies in the United Kingdom
1869 establishments in the United Kingdom